In metadata, dimension is a set of equivalent units of measure, where equivalence between two units of measure is determined by the existence of a quantity preserving one-to-one correspondence between values measured in one unit of measure and values measured in the other unit of measure, independent of context, and where characterizing operations are the same.

The equivalence defined here forms an equivalence relation on the set of all units of measure.  Each equivalence class corresponds to a dimensionality.  The units of measure "temperature in degrees Fahrenheit" and "temperature in degrees Celsius" have the same dimensionality, because given a value measured in degrees Fahrenheit there is a value measured in degrees Celsius with the same quantity, and vice versa.   Quantity preserving one-to-one correspondences are the well-known equations Cº = (5/9)*(Fº − 32) and Fº = (9/5)*(Cº) + 32.

Units of measure are not limited to physical categories. Examples of physical categories are: linear measure, area, volume, mass, velocity, time duration. Examples of non-physical categories are: currency, quality indicator, colour intensity.

Quantities may be grouped together into categories of quantities which are mutually comparable.  Lengths, diameters, distances, heights, wavelengths and so on would constitute such a category.  Mutually comparable quantities have the same dimensionality.  ISO 31-0 calls these quantities of the same kind.

See also
 Metadata
 Representation class

Metadata